Augie Doggie and Doggie Daddy are Hanna-Barbera cartoon characters who debuted on The Quick Draw McGraw Show and appeared in their own segment. The segments centered on the misadventures of a dachshund father-and-son team. Doggie Daddy (voiced on the show by Doug Young with a Brooklyn accent, based on a Jimmy Durante impersonation) tried to do the best he could at raising his rambunctious son Augie (voiced by Daws Butler). The characters have made appearances outside of their series, including in their own video game and in Yogi's Ark Lark and its spin-off series.

Summary
The segments centered around the misadventures of a dachshund father-and-son team. Doggie Daddy (voiced by Doug Young) tried to do the best he could at raising his rambunctious son Augie (voiced by Daws Butler). Augie, who loved his father, would often refer to him as "dear old Dad." Their mutual admiration included Daddy gently chiding, "Augie, my son, my son", when he would disappoint his father; and when his son would say or do something that inspired pride, Daddy would turn to the audience and say with a grin, "Dat's my boy who said dat!"

The segments and characters were similar to the Spike and Tyke cartoons William Hanna and Joseph Barbera produced during their theatrical animation careers at Metro-Goldwyn-Mayer in the 1940s and 1950s.

Theme song
A 45 rpm record released at the height of the show's popularity featured the show's theme song. The lyrics included this chorus:

An instrumental version of the song was used as the introductory theme to each cartoon.

Character information

Augie Doggie
Augie is a highly spirited pup who is motivated by ambition and the desire to make his father proud. He is typically seen wearing only a green shirt. Possessing some knowledge in science and the ability to converse with animals, Augie would often capitalize upon his father's foibles. In the 2021 series Jellystone!, Augie is depicted as female.

Doggie Daddy
The smooth-talking Doggie Daddy attempts to provide strict parental guidance to Augie, often to Augie's displeasure. Doggie Daddy is usually depicted wearing only a collar. Despite his strictness, Doggie Daddy has a warm personality and typically acquiesces to his son's wishes. Doug Young voiced Doggie Daddy as a Jimmy Durante impersonation.

Episodes

Series overview

Season 1 (1959–1960)

Season 2 (1960–1961)

Season 3 (1962)

In other languages

Later appearances
 Augie Doggie and Doggie Daddy appeared in Yogi's Ark Lark, its spin-off series Yogi's Gang, Laff-A-Lympics, and Yogi's Treasure Hunt. John Stephenson voiced Doggie Daddy in those appearances since Doug Young was first caring for his ailing wife at the time.  They also appeared in Casper's First Christmas, Yogi's First Christmas, Yogi Bear's All Star Comedy Christmas Caper, and Yogi Bear and the Magical Flight of the Spruce Goose.
 Doggie Daddy made a brief appearance in The Good, the Bad, and Huckleberry Hound.
 Augie Doggie and Doggie Daddy appeared in the "Fender Bender 500" segment of Wake, Rattle, and Roll. They drive a doghouse-modeled monster truck called the Lucky Trucky. 
 In Yo Yogi!, Doggie Daddy was referred to as "Diamond" Doggie Daddy where he owned Jellystone Mall and Augie was his heir. In those appearances, John Stephenson still voiced Doggie Daddy while Augie was voiced by Patric Zimmerman.
 Doggie Daddy made a cameo appearance on Family Guy, Season 9, Episode 17, "Brothers & Sisters" broadcast on April 17, 2011, in which he played the third husband of Lois' sister Carol. He tells her that Augie is all grown up and moved out.
 Augie Doggie and Doggie Daddy made a cameo in Web Premiere Toons short called "Law and Doggie".
 Augie Doggie and Doggie Daddy made a cameo appearance in a 2012 MetLife commercial entitled "Everyone" during Super Bowl XLVI.
 Augie Doggie and Doggie Daddy appeared in Harvey Birdman, Attorney at Law. Augie Doggie was voiced by Chris Edgerly and Doggie Daddy was voiced by Maurice LaMarche.
 Doggie Daddy made a cameo appearance as an elderly man in the I Am Weasel episode "I Am My Lifetime". 
 Augie Doggie and Doggie Daddy appeared in DC Comics' The Snagglepuss Chronicles.
 Augie Doggie and Doggie Daddy appeared in DC Comics' Deathstroke/Yogi Bear Special #1 as captured animals alongside other Hanna-Barbera characters. 
 Augie Doggie and Doggie Daddy made a cameo appearance in the Animaniacs segment "Suffragette City".
 Augie Doggie and Doggie Daddy appear in Jellystone! with Augie Doggie voiced by Georgie Kidder and Doggie Daddy voiced by C.H. Greenblatt. This version of Augie is female. It is revealed in the season 2 episode "The Big Stink", that Augie has no actual mother and she was created by magic.

Video game
A video game featuring and named for the characters was released in 1991 for the Commodore 64.

See also
 Quick Draw McGraw
 List of works produced by Hanna-Barbera

References

External links
 Augie Doggie and Doggie Daddy at the Big Cartoon DataBase
 Augie Doggie and Doggie Daddy at Don Markstein's Toonopedia. Archived from the original on April 7, 2012.

Television characters introduced in 1959
Animated characters introduced in 1959
1950s American animated television series
1960s American animated television series
1959 American television series debuts
1962 American television series endings
American children's animated comedy television series
Animated television series about children
Animated television series about dogs
Television series by Hanna-Barbera
Hanna-Barbera characters
First-run syndicated television programs in the United States
Yogi Bear characters
Television series by Screen Gems
Male characters in animation
Doggie, Augie
Doggie, Augie
Doggie, Augie
Animated duos
Anthropomorphic dogs
English-language television shows
Fiction about fatherhood